= Teton Sioux =

Teton Sioux may refer to:

- Lakota people, a Native American tribe
- Lakota language, a Siouan languages spoken by the Lakota people of the Sioux tribes
